In enzymology, a pinene synthase is an enzyme that catalyzes the chemical reaction

geranyl diphosphate  pinene + diphosphate

Hence, this enzyme has one substrate, geranyl diphosphate, and two products, pinene and diphosphate.

This enzyme belongs to the family of lyases, specifically those carbon-oxygen lyases acting on phosphates.  The systematic name of this enzyme class is geranyl-diphosphate diphosphate-lyase (cyclizing, pinene-forming). Other names in common use include beta-geraniolene synthase, (−)-(1S,5S)-pinene synthase, and geranyldiphosphate diphosphate lyase (pinene forming).  This enzyme participates in monoterpenoid biosynthesis.

References

 
 
 

EC 4.2.3
Enzymes of unknown structure